Eicochrysops masai, the Masai blue, is a butterfly in the family Lycaenidae. It is found in Ethiopia, northern Uganda, central and northern Kenya and northern Tanzania. Their habitat consists of grassy savanna.

References

Butterflies described in 1905
Eicochrysops